Mister Negative is a supervillain appearing in American comic books published by Marvel Comics. The character is usually depicted as an enemy of Spider-Man, the Punisher, and Cloak & Dagger. The character was created by Dan Slott and Phil Jimenez, and first appeared in "Swing Shift", a story in Free Comic Book Day: The Amazing Spider-Man #1 (March 2007). The name "Mister Negative" is a reference to photographic negative, as the colors of his skin, hair, and costume are inverted when he transforms into his alter ego.

Originally a Chinese gangster and human trafficker, whose real name was never revealed, the man who would become Mr. Negative was captured by crime boss Silvermane to serve as a test subject, alongside the future Cloak & Dagger, for an experimental procedure involving a synthetic drug created by Simon Marshall. The experiment gave the character control over both the Darkforce and Lightforce, and led to the creation of two polar opposite personalities: Mister Positive, posing as a benevolent and kind philanthropist named Martin Li, who would go on to found the F.E.A.S.T. Project as a means to help homeless people; and the ruthless crime lord Mister Negative, who leads the Inner Demons gang in an attempt to take over New York's criminal underworld. Originally, the character was depicted as suffering from dissociative identity disorder, with one personality not maintaining the other's memories, but both personas were later shown to be fully aware of each other's existence. As Mister Negative, his powers include healing, mind-controlling others through "corruption", and charging regular weapons with his energy.

Since his conception, the character has been adapted into several forms of media outside of comics, including animated series and video games.

Publication history
Created by Dan Slott and Phil Jimenez, Mister Negative first appeared in "Swing Shift", a story in Free Comic Book Day: The Amazing Spider-Man #1 (2007), which was set in the immediate aftermath of the "Spider-Man: One More Day" storyline. Mister Negative then appeared in The Amazing Spider-Man #546 (Jan. 2008), the first issue of the follow-up storyline "Brand New Day".

Fictional character biography
Martin Li is introduced with the backstory of a Chinese immigrant from Fujian province who attempted to travel to America to be with his wife. His mode of transportation, the Golden Mountain, was a slave ship operated by the Snakehead gang as a way to sell Fujian captives as overseas slaves in Kenya. During a storm, the ship's crew evacuated, leaving the captives alone to make a break for the New York shores. Li was the only survivor and spent the following years building a large fortune and dedicating himself to helping those less fortunate.

The story is later revealed to be 
partially false, though only the Mister Negative persona appears aware of it. It is revealed that Mister Negative was actually one of the crew members of the Golden Mountain. When the ship nearly crashed onto the New York shores, he stole the identity of one of the deceased Fujian slaves (the real Martin Li) who was heading to America for the aforementioned reasons. This gang member was eventually captured by the Maggia Don Silvermane and experimented on with a synthetic drug created by Maggia chemist Simon Marshall that could be more potent than heroin. He escaped with the help of two other experimental inmates and soon developed two personalities, the kind-hearted Martin Li and the villainous Mister Negative, the latter of the two developing the ability to generate a black electrical energy that could be used to heal, control others, or charge objects with his touch. The Mister Negative side dedicated himself to becoming Chinatown's Kingpin of Crime while the Martin Li side attempts to run the F.E.A.S.T. center with humility.

Martin Li opens and operates a soup kitchen in Chinatown: the F.E.A.S.T. Project (Food, Emergency Aid, Shelter and Training), where Peter Parker's Aunt May volunteers. Neither Peter nor May are aware of Li's dual identity as a Chinatown crime boss under the Mister Negative name. Despite being a crime lord, Li is a seemingly kind and generous man. The F.E.A.S.T. Project has displayed healing powers for people of various illnesses, although the cause of this healing has yet to be revealed.

During the first story of "Brand New Day" storyline, Mister Negative first comes into conflict with Spider-Man when he makes a power play toward taking control of New York's criminal underworld by attempting to wipe out all existing members of the Karnelli and Maggia crime families using a DNA specific bioweapon called the "Devil's Breath". In exchange for leaving the Maggia families' children alive, he takes a sample of Spider-Man's blood to use in a Devil's Breath formula. Mister Negative later tries to use the Devil's Breath formula to kill Spider-Man during a fight with the Maggia, but Spider-Man is able to hold his breath long enough to escape alive. Spider-Man then recruits the Black Cat to help steal Spider-Man's remaining blood from Mister Negative and replace it with a vial of pig blood so Mister Negative is unaware of his loss.

Martin Li endorses Bill Hollister for mayor of New York City, putting him against Randall Crowne, adding him to a list of opponents (many of whom become targets of the villain Menace). It also causes him to become the target of a smear campaign by Dexter Bennet, editor of The DB and supporter of Crowne. After Menace is revealed to be Hollister's daughter and Hollister resigns as mayor, Li unsuccessfully runs in a special election, losing to J. Jonah Jameson.

Mister Negative later recruits Hammerhead and offers to put the man's brain in a new robotic adamantium skeleton after having been shot point blank in the head by Underworld. Hammerhead agrees to that and Mister Negative has his surgeon Doctor Tramma perform the procedure.

Mister Negative eventually comes across Eddie Brock, giving a job at his soup kitchen. A touch from him causes Brock's cancerous cells to completely disappear. Also, remnants of the Venom symbiote fused with Brock's white blood cells react with Mister Negative's power, causing Anti-Venom's existence during a conflict with Mac Gargan, the Venom Symbiote's host. After the F.E.A.S.T center is torn apart during the fight between the two, Li discovers from a group of sweatshop workers (from a shop owned by Crowne) that they were experimented on with drugs made at Oscorp. Later, Mister Negative and his Inner Demons encounter and battle Anti-Venom. In the aftermath, Brock watches Mister Negative turn into Li, becoming the first to be aware of his double identity.

During the 2008–2009 "Dark Reign" storyline, Mister Negative refuses to submit to the Hood’s rule of conquest over New York's criminal underworld. During a meeting with Hood's henchman White Dragon, Mister Negative corrupts White Dragon and sends the man to attack the Hood's headquarters. In retaliation, the Hood decides to attack and kill him. H.A.M.M.E.R. seals Chinatown on Hood's behalf and an all out fight breaks out around Li's estate. Hood's gang gets the upper hand until Spider-Man arrives to rescue Martin. However, Spider-Man too is corrupted and sent into battle on Mister Negative's behalf. Spider-Man battles the members of Hood's gang who are attacking the villain's headquarters; Mister Negative then sends the web-slinger to kill Betty Brant who is interviewing the real Martin Li's widow and is coming close to finding out the truth. The Hood himself then confronts Mister Negative at his Chinatown headquarters and battles him. During the battle, Mister Negative tries to corrupt Hood but fails. Norman Osborn ends the blockade H.A.M.M.E.R. has on Chinatown when Hammerhead hands papers implicating Oscorp in the aforementioned drug tests on immigrants. An irate Hood decides to kill Mister Negative anyway but he escapes. A later conversation that Osborn has with his own darker Green Goblin side reveals that he now has an alliance with Mister Negative similar to the one with Hood. However, Spot slips in and steals back the evidence of Oscorp's tests, revealing being Mister Negative's mole in the Hood's gang under the promise that he will be cured once they get their revenge on the Maggia.

In the X-Men storyline "Serve and Protect", Mister Negative and his Inner Demons are at San Francisco on attempting to murder a widowed woman who still have a child. When two unidentified heroes, then revealed to be the X-Men Rockslide and Anole in disguise, Mister Negative hired The Serpents, and devise a plan to lure them into their traps, then turning then into his pawn into attacking other X-Men as well. Although his plan foiled by Anole's strategy into using a temporary brainwashed Rockslide, Mister Negative releases the rock mutant hero and vow they will meet again on the other side.

During the 2009 storyline "The Gauntlet", Mister Negative corrupts May Parker when the woman walks in on him punishing an Inner Demon. May manages to break free from Mister Negative's corruption when Peter went to May for moral support after the Lizard devoured Billy Connors and essentially 'killed' Curt Connors.

During the 2010 "Shadowland" storyline, Mister Negative takes the advantage of the conflict against the Hand in a plot to set up a criminal establishment there, only for him and his Inner Demons to run afoul of Spider-Man and Shang-Chi.

Mister Negative later has an encounter with Jackpot and Boomerang. During the "Origin of the Species" storyline, Mister Negative was among the supervillains assembled by Doctor Octopus to secure some items.

During the "Big Time" storyline, Mister Negative is targeted by both Anti-Venom and the new Wraith. When they, along with Spider-Man, interrupt a heroin-smuggling operation, Wraith uses visual recognition software, linked to every television broadcast in New York, to publicly out Mister Negative as Martin Li. When the police approach, Mister Negative and his men retreat. Li is later seen locked in a room by Mister Negative's men who wait for him to change back into their master.

During the 2011 "Spider-Island" storyline, Mister Negative is told of a prophecy that he is destined to be killed by Dagger.

During the 2012 "Avengers vs. X-Men" storyline, Mister Negative and his henchmen invade a S.H.I.E.L.D. facility as a way of taking an advantage of the war between the Avengers and the Phoenix Five, but Hawkeye and Spider-Woman defeat them while having a discussion about their relationship. It is later revealed that they were informed about Mister Negative's plan by Madame Hydra who wanted to get rid of the competition.

During the 2014 "Original Sin" storyline, Mister Negative is seen meeting with the self-proclaimed Goblin King (Phil Urich) who is now leading the Goblin Underground's remnants when it came to them awaiting for Eel II to help divide the criminal underground following the original Goblin King's defeat. Their meeting is crashed by Black Cat and Electro who demand their share of the plan. When Mister Negative and Urich refuse to listen to Black Cat, the woman reminds them that they were all outed by Spider-Man and will succeed in the goal of defeating Spider-Man.

Following the 2015 "Secret Wars" storyline, Martin Li is arrested at some point. He is rescued by Cloak and Dagger who have been corrupted by his touch and are using patches of the drug known as "Shade" to stimulate the effects of Mister Negative's touch and "remain" loyal to him. After the two break Mister Negative out of the prison ship where Li is being held and revert him to his Negative form, he leads an assault on Parker Industries' Japan branch, which leads to a confrontation with Spider-Man, whom Negative manages to touch. Although Peter exhibits an immunity to Negative's corruption power, Negative escapes to his Hong Kong headquarters and reverts to Li. Li later sees a video message from Negative that he is targeting a philanthropist named Shen Quinghao, the former leader of the criminal Snakehead Syndicate which controlled the slave ship where Li became Mister Negative, and makes a proposal to Li, which Li accepts. His plan fails, and after Cloak and Dagger are eventually freed from Negative's control, they vow to remain in Hong Kong to protect it from Negative's future efforts.

During the "Sins Rising" arc, a revived Sin-Eater steals the powers of Mister Negative and uses it to corrupt the guards at Ravencroft when he targets Norman Osborn. He also uses the powers to corrupt the clone of Ashley Kafka into releasing Juggernaut.

A man claiming to be "Martin Li" shows up at the FEAST building seeking help as the Inner Demons attack. This "Martin Li" later surrenders to the Inner Demons. Mister Negative meets with Mayor Wilson Fisk and informs him that they will need the sister counterpart of the Tablet of Life and Destiny called the Tablet of Death and Entropy. As Mister Negative has the item, he states to Mayor Fisk that their desired function can only be used when both items are together. Mayor Fisk allows Mister Negative to control Chinatown and the Lower East Side. Obtaining the Tablet of Life and Destiny from Spider-Man and Boomerang puts Mister Negative in completion with Black Mariah, Crime Master, Diamondback, Hammerhead, Madame Masque, Owl, Silvermane, and Tombstone.

Powers and abilities
It initially appears that Martin Li has no knowledge of his evil side. During "New Ways To Die", Li took Eddie Brock into a back room he calls his inner sanctuary, where he claims to play a game of Go day by day against an unknown opponent who he has never seen, claiming that he has "learned that it's okay to enjoy the game". When he transforms into Mr. Negative, Li's appearance resembles that of a photographic negative. He also speaks in a reverse colored speech balloon, although this does nothing to the sound of his voice.

Prior to his transformation, "Martin Li" was a member of the Snakehead gang, whose true name has not yet been revealed. Both the Martin Li and Mr. Negative personas are the result of experimental drug tests done by Maggia chemist Simon Marshall, the same tests that powered Cloak and Dagger (namely Cloak's association with the Darkforce). Unlike the two heroes, who were each given a power over light and dark, the gang member was given both a light and dark side. As such, Mr. Negative considers himself an embodiment of black and wickedness and both of his personas view the balance of good and evil as a necessary part of the universe. The two halves, while fully aware of one another's existence, take no steps to interfere with one another, with the Martin Li persona even taking such drastic steps as allowing his bad side to corrupt May Parker to keep it a secret.

During an encounter in The Amazing Spider-Man #621, Mr. Negative displays a degree of superhuman strength high enough to send Spider-Man flying through two buildings with a single blow. Mr. Negative also demonstrates superhuman reflexes during his battle with the Hood, dodging bullets or cutting them in half with his sword. He also has the power to charge up knives and swords with black electrical energy, a form of Darkforce energy, and he can corrupt people he touches in the same manner, bringing them under his control. A corrupted person's clothes change his colors to his photographic negatives, and all who are corrupted praise their new master with proclamations like "Mr. Negative was never born, so he is ever living", or "He is attached to nothing, thus he is one with all." The effectiveness of his corruption varies depending on how good the affected person was before their conversion: White Dragon, a villain himself, gained vastly increased stamina and endurance, but was still easily dispatched (his clothes reverted to normal once he was killed). Conversely, Spider-Man, a hero in every respect, was corrupted into a spiteful and angry villain, despising every value he held dear (even his Uncle Ben's memory) and no more above killing. Spider-Man is able to break the hold his malevolent side has over him when he is on the verge of killing Betty Brant, as he remembers the love he once had for her upon getting close. Mr. Negative's corrupting touch appears to be ineffective against beings with supernatural powers, as Hood is unaffected when Negative attempts to corrupt him; Mr. Negative claims that this is because the Hood's soul belongs to Dormammu, a being even darker than he is. It has since been revealed that while Negative can renew his influence on others, he cannot corrupt someone once that individual has broken free of his influence already, allowing Peter Parker to infiltrate his plan by using the fact that he had been corrupted by Negative as Spider-Man without his foe knowing his secret identity.

Mr. Negative's alternate Martin Li persona seems to have the power to cure others: in The Amazing Spider-Man #568, a simple touch from Li completely cures Eddie Brock of his cancer, and combines the remnants of the Venom symbiote in his blood with his white blood cells, creating a new symbiote named Anti-Venom that possesses similar healing powers. Aside from this, homeless people who have stayed at Martin Li's shelter have rapidly recovered from any illnesses or injuries they suffered from. It is possible that his healing touch is supposed to be the opposite of Mr. Negative's corrupting touch. It is revealed that Anti-Venom can be affected by Mr. Negative's energy because it negates his healing ability.

Mr. Negative also has access to advanced technology and secret laboratories, in which he is able to give his subjects medical care far more advanced than that available to the general public.

In the 2018 Spider-Man game, Mr. Negative also possesses the ability to project powerful electricity-like blasts of negative energy from his hands.

Inner Demons
Mister Negative is often accompanied by several henchmen, known as his Inner Demons, who wear Chinese opera masks and use high tech electrified versions of swords, knuckles and various other Asian weaponry such as gun staffs and nunchakus. They are able to regenerate from even the most lethal wounds within a matter of seconds, as they have been shown almost immediately recovering from impalement, gunshots to the head, and even getting torn apart or decapitated. It has been implied that the Inner Demons can be killed under the right circumstances: at one point, Anti-Venom claims to have killed some of them, possibly by suffocation, which he later notes to be an effective tactic against them. Mr. Negative also orders the murder of two Inner Demons who have failed him.

Reception
 In 2020, CBR.com included Mister Negative in their "Spider-Man: The Best New Villains of the Century" list.

Other versions

Infinity Warps
In Warp World, a world folded in half during the Infinity Wars event, Dagger Li (a combination of Dagger and Martin Li) is a member of the occult paramilitary group named the Midnight Guns. They were attacked in their base in Salem by Weapon Hex (a combination of X-23 and Scarlet Witch) and Hellhound (a combination of Magik and Sabretooth) on behalf of Herbert Wyndham to steal the Storm Sigil from team-member Hellfire (combination of Punisher and Daimon Hellstrom). The two attackers made quick work of the Midnight Guns and left no survivors.

Spider-Ham
The Spider-Ham incarnation of Mr. Negative is a tiger called Mr. Negatiger. This version has not appeared in any media outside of the 2022 Spider-Ham graphic novel, Hollywood May-ham. Like the comics, he employs the Inner Demons (who are curiously all human) as his emissaries. He is captured and webbed up by Spider-Ham in the opening of the story. In the last chapter, it is revealed the cops did not capture Mr. Negatiger and he has escaped once more.

In other media

Television
 A Marvel Noir-inspired incarnation of Mister Negative appears in the Ultimate Spider-Man episode "Return to the Spider-Verse" Pt. 3, voiced by Keone Young. This version is initially a henchman for Hammerhead before he acquires the power to petrify targets from a Siege Perilous shard. After hearing the "prime" Spider-Man call Spider-Man Noir "Mister Negative", Li takes the name for himself and uses his abilities on his boss, Kid Arachnid, and Joe Fixit's gang before swaying Hammerhead's remaining gang members to his side. Li attempts to use his abilities on all of New York City, but is ultimately defeated by the Spider-Men and Fixit, who strip him of his powers and restore everyone he petrified to normal.
 Mister Negative appears in the Spider-Man (2017) episode "Brand New Day", voiced by Eric Bauza. This version is a rival of fellow crime lord Molten Man who becomes afraid of the Superior Spider-Man.

Video games
 Mister Negative appears as a playable character in Marvel Strike Force. 
 Mister Negative appears as a playable character in Marvel Contest of Champions.
 Mister Negative appears as a playable character in Lego Marvel Super Heroes 2 via the "Cloak and Dagger" DLC.
 Mister Negative appears as a recurring boss in Spider-Man (2018), voiced by Stephen Oyoung. As Martin Li, he is the benevolent founder and director of F.E.A.S.T. and the boss of May Parker, whom he admires for her selflessness, along with her nephew Peter, whose dedication to others inspires him. As Mister Negative, he is the ruthless leader of a gang called the Inner Demons, some of whom possess a portion of his powers, who seeks to conquer the Kingpin's territory following the crime boss' defeat at Spider-Man's hands. Li also seeks revenge against Mayor Norman Osborn for using him as a test subject for the Devil's Breath virus in his youth, which granted him his powers but traumatized him after he lost control of them and accidentally killed his parents. Though Spider-Man foils Li's initial attempt to exact revenge and the latter is imprisoned at the Raft, he is soon broken out by Otto Octavius and joins his Sinister Six to help him exact revenge on Osborn as well as steal the antidote for the Devil's Breath after Octavius releases the virus upon New York. However, Negative is defeated a second time by Spider-Man and abandoned by Octavius.
 Mister Negative appears in Marvel Snap.

Collected editions

Notes

References

External links
 
 Mister Negative at Comic Vine
 Inner Demons at Comic Vine
 

Villains in animated television series
Characters created by Dan Slott
Comics characters introduced in 2008
Fictional characters from New York City
Fictional characters with healing abilities
Fictional characters with dissociative identity disorder
Fictional crime bosses
Fictional immigrants to the United States
Fictional gangsters
Fictional mass murderers
Fictional terrorists
Marvel Comics characters with superhuman strength
Fictional Chinese people
Spider-Man characters
Triad (organized crime)
Video game bosses